The costomediastinal recess is a potential space at the border of the mediastinal pleura and the costal pleura. It assists lung expansion during deep inspiration, although its role is not as significant as the costodiaphragmatic recess, which has a greater volume. The lung expands into the costomediastinal recess even during shallow inspiration. The costomediastinal recess is most obvious in the cardiac notch of the left lung.

See also
 Costodiaphragmatic recess (Costophrenic angle)
 Cardiophrenic angle
 Mediastinum

External links
  - "Pleural Cavities and Lungs: The Costomediastinal Recess"
  - "X-ray, chest, posteroanterior view"
 Diagram at port.ac.uk

Pleura